"Roma" is a 2005 song by Iranian-born Swedish pop singer Cameron Cartio. It is sung in a conlang Cameron Cartio himself made. He took part with the song in the 2005 version of Melodifestivalen in Sweden in a bid to represent Sweden in the 2005 Eurovision Song Contest that took place in Kyiv, Ukraine.

In the Melodifestivalen competition, he reached Semi-final 2 which was held on 19 February 2005 in Tipshallen, Växjö and came 4th out of 8 in that phase as a result of televoting, was given a "second chance".

In the "second chance round" held on 6 March 2005, held in Berns, Stockholm, he took part wit 7 other contestants, namely Alcazar, Linda Bengtzing, Josefin Nilsson, Na Na, LaGaylia, Mathias Holmgren and Katrina and the Nameless, he was unsuccessful in moving to the Finals round. Martin Stenmarck went on to win the Melodifestivalen competition with his song "Las Vegas".

Track list
"Roma" (3:00)
"Roma (extended Version)" (3:11)

Charts
Despite "Roma" not being successful in winning the bid to represent Sweden, the song became very popular with the Swedish public, and "Roma" was released on Sony/BMG and became a hit on Sverigetopplistan the official Swedish Singles Chart, reaching #4 as its top position.

Spanish version
Cameron Cartio released a Spanish language version of the song in Spain, a practice he would repeat with his follow-up song "Henna", a duo with Khaled, again partly in Cameron Cartio's constructed language, but released in Spain in a Spanish-language version.

References

2005 songs
Cameron Cartio songs
Song recordings produced by Alex P
Melodifestivalen songs of 2005
Sony BMG singles